Kdan Mobile Software is a privately owned application and software development company based in Tainan City, Taiwan. Kdan also has branches in Taipei, Changsha, Irvine, California, Japan, and South Korea. The company was founded in 2009 by Kenny Su, the company’s CEO.

The company recently completed its Series B round of fundraising, in which it raised 16 million USD in total. Four global firms, Dattoz Partners (South Korea), WI Harper Group (U.S.), Taiwania Capital (Taiwan), and Golden Asia Fund Mitsubishi UFJ Capital (Japan), made up the Series B investment. Kdan previously raised 5 million USD in its Series A round in 2018, at which point it was also named a Top-10 Best Software Company by the Silicon Review.

History

Inception 
Kdan Mobile got its start in 2009 when Kenny Su developed PDF Reader, an application that converts documents into PDF files. The application was well-received by the market and inspired Su to start Kdan.

Initial Products and Growth 
Kdan’s flagship applications include the PDF Reader series, NoteLedge, and Animation Desk series. They have since added Markup, Write-on Video, and NoteLedge. Their applications are supported on all operating systems and are available on smart devices and desktops.

In July 2015, Kdan launched a new series of apps (Creativity 365), integrated with its own Cloud services.

The company built upon its experience with PDF technology by successfully introducing DottedSign, an eSign service, in the spring of 2019. DottedSign is available on any device or operating system.

All projects and documents created or edited in the company’s software can be stored on the Kdan Cloud, their online storage service. The Kdan Cloud was released as a standalone application available for download on Apple and Android devices in early 2019.

In April 2022, Kdan released a Podcast and YouTube knowledge management platform, Inspod, that allows learners to listen to podcasts or watch videos on YouTube.

Partnerships 
Kdan has expressed an interest in working with strategic business partners to increase its presence in international markets. In 2014, Kdan partnered with Nokia, so their NoteLedge application would come pre-installed in Nokia’s Lumia 1320 for the Taiwanese market. Kdan entered into similar partnerships with Samsung (2014), Adonit (2014), and LKKER (2017), and Qihoo 360(2018). In 2019, the company partnered with Sourcenext, an independent consumer software provider in Japan. The goal of the partnership is to provide Kdan's PDF Reader to Japanese users through App Pass by Softbank, a Japanese multinational conglomerate.

References 

Taiwanese companies established in 2009
Electronics companies of Taiwan
Application software
Companies based in Tainan
Software companies of Taiwan
Software companies established in 2009
Taiwanese brands